Mikey Cipriani (1886 – 1934) was a Trinidad and Tobago aviation pioneer, cyclist, footballer and cricketer. He played in two first-class matches for Trinidad and Tobago in 1911/12 and 1912/13.

Cipriani died in a plane crash in the Northern Range on 3 June 1934 on a flight from Mucurapo to Tobago. His body was found near Brasso Seco after eight days search.

See also
 List of Trinidadian representative cricketers

References

External links
 

1886 births
1934 deaths
Trinidad and Tobago cricketers
Victims of aviation accidents or incidents in Trinidad and Tobago
Trinidad and Tobago military personnel
Trinidad and Tobago cyclists
Trinidad and Tobago boxers
Trinidad and Tobago aviators
Trinidad and Tobago footballers